The Dongan Hills station is a Staten Island Railway station in the neighborhood of Dongan Hills, Staten Island, New York.

History
The station opened on April 23, 1860, with the opening of the Staten Island Railway from Vanderbilt's Landing to Eltingville.

The station's original name was Garretsons, named after the original name of the neighborhood of the same name. The station's name changed after the neighborhood was renamed Dongan Hills. The name Garretson still can be found as there is a street that passes under the station. Both names appeared on the October 16, 1921 timetable. On February 21, 1907, the Staten Island Railway petitioned the Public Service Commission (PSC) to get permission to move the Dongan Hills stop from its location south of Seaview Avenue to a location  to the north in between Seaview Avenue and Garretson Avenue. On March 12, 1907, the PSC granted its permission.

Station layout

The station is located on an embankment at Seaview Avenue and Railroad Avenue on the main line. It has two side platforms and beige canopies.

The marble wall at street level on the south end is a legacy of when the line was converted from grade level to the current embankment level today. The grade separation took place in 1933.  Free parking is available on a small lot adjacent to the northbound platform, which is owned by the MTA, the agency that controls the rail line. The brick station house is unusually positioned on the northbound side at platform level, unlike other SIR station houses, which are usually located on street level. The Dongan Hills station house had a ticket booth and benches until 1987, and then a vending machine for tokens until July 4, 1997 when the fare was eliminated for all stations south of St. George.

South of this station, there is an additional third track that once served a coal distributor. Grates between the rails led to chutes which now open into the backyards of homes that run alongside the embankment.

Exits
There are staircases at the north end that lead to Garretson Avenue. The Dongan Hills station is handicapped accessible in compliance with the Americans with Disabilities Act of 1990, with ramps at the south end that lead to the southern side of Seaview Avenue. Stairs also lead from each platform to the northern side of Seaview Avenue.

References

External links

Staten Island Railway station list
Staten Island Railway general information
 Garretson Avenue entrance from Google Maps Street View
 Seaview Avenue entrance from Google Maps Street View
 Platform level from Google Maps Street View

Staten Island Railway stations
Railway stations in the United States opened in 1860
1860 establishments in New York (state)